The North Coast Soccer League (NCSL) is a soccer league in northern Ohio recognized by the Ohio Soccer Association North (OSA-N), the United States Adult Soccer Association (USASA).
The league is affiliated to the United States Adult Soccer Association and teams qualify for the U.S. Open Cup through USASA channels. The league is generally considered to be at the fifth tier of competition in the United States soccer pyramid.

History
The North Coast Soccer League was founded in 1982 in Northern Ohio.

Records

Total Cup Championship Appearances

2012 Season Awards

"Goal"den Boot Award - Ivan Pandza (9 goals)

Goalkeeper of the Year Award - Eric Sebor (1.167 GAA)

Team Fair Play Award - United FC (4 points)

2012 Teams
As of October 16, 2012

Cleveland Kickers
Concordia
Donauschwaben
Frontline FC
Manchester United
Partizan Ohio FC
Revelations SC
Sixth City FC
UASC Ternopil
United FC
Western Reserve FC
Westside FC
Woodridge PFC

References

External links
NCSL Website

5
United States Adult Soccer Association leagues
Soccer in Ohio
1982 establishments in Ohio
Sports leagues established in 1982
Regional Soccer leagues in the United States